Institute Menezes Braganza is a cultural institution set up by the Portuguese in colonial times, during the late 19th century. It was taken over by the Government of Goa and continues to play a role in cultural activities of Goa. In recent years, its takeover by the government was fought over in the Bombay High Court.

History

After being set up in 1871, by the then Portuguese government, initially named the Institute Vasco da Gama (IVG) functioned for a short while, and turned dormant for about five decades, between 1875 and 1925. At that time, the need for an institute focussing on literary, scientific and cultural themes was felt again by around 1924, and a new  Portaria (provincial order 105 dated 10 February 1925 and Legislative Diploma or enactment No.144 of 26 March 1925 was passed. An annual grant of Rs.10,000 was given.

Renamed
Following the end of Portuguese rule in Goa in 1961 by Indian Army action, the institute was renamed after Luís de Menezes Bragança, a campaigner against colonial rule. It continued to get official government support. In 1997, in a step which was questioned by some, the Government of Goa took over the institution, and re-established it as a society under the Indian Registration of Societies Act, 1860.

According to official documents, its aims are to "focus mainly on the promotion of activities in the fields of Language, Literature, Art & Culture in Goa". It also "primarily seeks to promote Goan talent in allied areas and to meet the versatile cultural interests of Goan society as a whole."

Collaborations
It works with other institutions such as the Indian National Book Trust, New Delhi, Sahitya Akademi, the Goa Konkani Akademi, the Gomantak Marathi Akademi, Gomantak Sahitya Sevak Mandal, among others. It is located in the centre of Panjim. Its recent (2013) renovation makes it a hall of choice for organising public functions, though parking can be a problem in the area.

Activities
It organises literary and cultural activities, and also published the Bulletin of the Institute Menezes Braganza.

1997 change

In 1997, the Pratapsing Rane Government in Goa enacted changes in laws for:

 Dissolution of the managing committee;
 Adjudication of claims, and payment of compensation for any claims;
 Handing over of the assets, books of records and properties of the Institute, by those holding them;
 The repeal of all laws and orders  governing or in any manner concerning the affairs of the Institute.

Court decision

The Bombay High Court dismissed the petition against the takeover of the IMG, but expressed "a hope that the respondent- State [Government of Goa] shall maintain artifacts and/or paintings and/or coins and/or other valuable articles and shall make all attempts to preserve Portuguese culture for future generation."

References

External links
IMB, official description
At Institute Menezes Braganza, work is slow & unsteady
The Goa (Institute Menezes Braganza) (Supplemental Provisions) Act, 1997
Institute Menezes Braganza caught up in a row

Culture of Goa
Organisations based in Goa
1871 establishments in Portuguese India
Organizations established in 1871